Macquarie Generation is an electricity generation company in New South Wales, Australia, owned by AGL Energy, and has a portfolio of generating sites using predominantly thermal coal power. The company now trades as AGL Macquarie and generates electricity for sale under contract.

AGL Macquarie supplies approximately 12% of the National Electricity Market and 30% of the New South Wales electricity market. In early stages, Macquarie has commenced development of solar thermal power as a renewable source of energy.

History

In September 2014, the NSW Government sold Macquarie Generation to AGL Energy for $1.5 billion. Macquarie Generation's assets included the 2,640 MW Bayswater Power Station, the 2,000 MW Liddell Power Station, the 50 MW Hunter Valley Gas Turbines and the Liddell Solar Thermal Project.

The Liddell Power Station is scheduled to close in April 2023.

Generation portfolio
Macquarie Generation owns and operates the following power stations:

References

External links

Macquarie Generation

Government-owned companies of New South Wales
Electric power companies of Australia